Michaelovitch may refer to:

Alexis Michaelovitch, also known as Alexis of Russia
Grand Duke Michael Mikhailovich of Russia